is a Japanese kickboxer, currently competing in the super featherweight division of Shoot Boxing.

A professional competitor since 2017, he is a two-weight Shootboxing champion, having held the Japan Super Featherweight title since 2021, and the Japan Featherweight title between 2020 and 2021.

As of July 2022 he was the #6 ranked Bantamweight in the world by Combat Press.

Career

Super bantamweight

Career beginnings
Kasahara made his professional debut against Pako Lai at Shoot Boxing 2017 act.2 on April 8, 2017. He won the fight by technical knockout midway through the first round, as Lai  dislocated his left arm.

A month later, Kasahara was booked to face Genki Takeno at Shoot Boxing 2017 Young Cesar in Hanayashiki act.2 on May 13, 2017. He won the fight by unanimous decision, with all three judges scoring the bout 29–28 in his favor.

Kasahara faced his second foreign opponent, Kim So Hu, at Shoot Boxing 2017 Young Cesar in Hanayashiki act.3 on August 6, 2017. He won the fight by a first-round technical knockout, forcing Kim's corner to throw in the towel near the end of the round.

Kasahara faced Shuto Sato at Shoot Boxing 2017 act.4 on September 16, 2017, five weeks after his victory against Hu. He won the fight by unanimous decision, with scores of 30–26, 30–27 and 30–27.

Kasahara faced the WMC Japan super flyweight champion Koki Yamada in a 54.5 kg catchweight bout at Shoot Boxing 2017 Young Cesar in Hanayashiki act.4 on October 14, 2017. He won the fight by unanimous decision, with scores of 30–26, 30–25 and 30–25. Kasahara scored a shoot point with a head and arm throw in the first-round, and badly staggered Yamada with a flurry of punches near the end of the last round.

Kasahara faced Ryu, in his sixth and final fight of the year, at Shoot Boxing 2017 Young Cesar in Hanayashiki act.5 on December 17, 2017. He won the fight by unanimous decision. Kasahara scored two shoot points, one in the first and one in the third round.

Kasahara faced Keito Naito at Shoot Boxing 2018 act.1 on February 10, 2018. He knocked Naito down with a flurry of punches, before knocking him out with a right hook at the 2:48 minute mark of the first round.

Kasahara faced Genki Takeno at Shoot Boxing 2018 act.2 on April 1, 2018. He won the fight by majority decision. Two of the judges scored the fight 30–29 and 30–28 for Kasahara, while the third judge scored it as an even 29–29 draw.

Shootboxing super bantamweight tournament
Kasahara faced the fourth ranked Shootboxing super bantamweight Ryota Naito at Shoot Boxing 2018 act.2 on June 10, 2018, in the quarterfinals of the Shootboxing tournament. He won the fight by unanimous decision, with two scorecards of 30–27 and one scorecard of 30–28.

Kasahara faced the second ranked Shootboxing super bantamweight Kyo Kawakami in the co-main event of Shoot Boxing 2018 act.4 on September 15, 2018. He won the semifinal bout of the tournament by a first-round knockout, stopping Kawakami at the very end of the first round.

His 10–0 undefeated streak earned Kasahara the #2 ranking in the division, as well as the right to face Seiki Ueyama in the finals of the Shootboxing super bantamweight tournament, with the vacant title on the line. The bout was booked as the co-main event of Shoot Boxing S-cup 65 kg World Tournament 2018 on November 18, 2018. Ueyama handed Kasahara his first professional loss, stopping him with a flurry of punches at the 0:56 minute mark of the third round.

Kasahara fought twice more at super bantamweight, before moving up to featherweight (-57.5 kg). He first stopped Shota Tezuka with a right hook in the first round at Shoot Boxing 2019 act.2 on April 27, 2019, which he followed up with a third-round technical knockout of Eisaku Ogasawara at Shoot Boxing 2019 act.3 on June 23, 2019.

Move to featherweight

Early featherweight career
After successfully rebounded from his first professional loss, Kasahara moved up to featherweight to face Ponchan Bravegym at Shoot Boxing 2019 act.4 on September 28, 2019. He won the fight by unanimous decision, with scores of 30–27, 29–28 and 30–28.

Kasahara faced Lertchai Aor.Saensuk at Shoot Boxing GROUND ZERO TOKYO 2019 on December 3, 2019. He won the fight by a third-round technical knockout, stopping Lertchai with a flurry of punches in the final minute of the last round.

Kasahara faced Kaito Sakaguchi at Shoot Boxing 2020 act.1 on February 15, 2020. He won the fight by majority decision, after two extension rounds were fought.

Kasahara vs. Nasukawa
On June 23, 2019, Kasahara was booked in the highest profile bout of his career up to that point, as it was announced that he would face the Rizin FF flyweight and RISE World featherweight champion Tenshin Nasukawa at the July 12, 2019 Rise on Abema event. The non-title bout was broadcast by Abema and was held in front of an empty arena, due to measures implemented to combat the COVID-19 pandemic. Kasahara lost the fight by a first-round stoppage, as he was knocked down three times by the midway point of the opening round, which resulted in a technical knockout victory for Nasukawa.

Shootboxing Japan Featherweight champion
Kasahara, who was at the time the top ranked Shootboxing featherweight, was booked to face the #4 ranked featherweight contender Shota Tezuka for the vacant title at Shoot Boxing 2020 act.2 on September 19, 2020. He won the fight by a fourth-round technical knockout. Both fighters traded knockdowns in the second round, while Kasahara scored the sole shoot point in the first round.

Kasahara faced Shogo Kuriaki in a non-title bout at Shoot Boxing 2021 act.2	on February 7, 2021. He won the fight by unanimous decision.

Kasahara faced Shuto Miyazaki in another non-title bout at Shoot Boxing 2021 act.2 on April 10, 2021. Miyazaki failed to make weight before the fight, coming in at 58 kg, 0.5 kg above the featherweight limit of 57.5 kg. Kasahara won the fight by unanimous decision.

Kasahara faced Pon SirilakGym at Shoot Boxing 2021 act.4 on September 4, 2021, in his final fight at featherweight. Despite a poor start to the fight, which saw him get knocked down with a left hook in the first round, Kasahara rallied to win the fight by a second-round technical knockout.

Move to super featherweight
Kasahara was booked to face the second ranked Shootboxing super featherweight contender Shota Tezuka for the vacant title at Shoot Boxing 2021 Champion Carnival on December 26, 2021, in his first fight at super featherweight. He won the fight by unanimous decision. Two judges scored the bout 49–46 in his favor, while the third judge scored it 50–45 for Kasahara.

Kasahara made his promotional debut with Rizin FF against Motoki at Rizin 34 – Osaka on March 20, 2022. He won the fight by a first-round knockout, stopping Motoki with a flying knee in the last minute of the opening round.

On May 19, 2022, it was announced that Kasahara would face the reigning Krush Super Featherweight champion Chihiro Nakajima in a cross-promotional fight on June 19, 2022. The bout was scheduled for the undercard of THE MATCH 2022, an Abema pay per view headlined by Takeru Segawa and Tenshin Nasukawa. Kasahara won the fight by unanimous decision, with scores of 30–28, 30–28 and 30–27. He scored the sole knockdown of the fight in the third round, when he dropped Nakajima with a right hook.

Kasahara faced the second ranked RISE super featherweight contender Hyuma Hitachi at SHOOT BOXING 2022 act.4 on September 14, 2022. He lost the fight by a second-round knockout.

Kasahara faced the third ranked RISE super featherweight contender Yusaku Ishizuki at RISE WORLD SERIES / SHOOTBOXING-KINGS on December 25, 2022. He won the fight by unanimous decision, with all three judges scoring the bout 30–25 for him. He knocked Ishizuki down in both the second and third rounds, both times with a left straight.

Kasahara faced TAaaaCHAN at SHOOT BOXING 2023 act.1 on February 12, 2023. He won the fight by unanimous decision, with scores of 30–29, 30–29 and 30–28.

Championships and accomplishments

Amateur
 2013 Shoot Boxing All Japan Junior -45 kg Championship
 2014 All Japan Shoot Boxing Junior -50 kg Championship
 2015 Muay Thai Open -50 kg Championship
 2015 Shoot Boxing All Japan Junior -50 kg Championship
 2016 Shoot Boxing All Japan Junior -50 kg Championship

Professional
SHOOT BOXING
 2020 Shoot Boxing Japan Featherweight (-57.5 kg) Championship
 2021 Shoot Boxing Japan Super Featherweight (-60 kg) Championship

Fight record

|-  style="background:#cfc;"
| 2023-02-12 || Win ||align=left| TAaaaCHAN || SHOOT BOXING 2023 act.1|| Tokyo, Japan || Decision (Unanimous) || 3 || 3:00 

|-  style="background:#cfc;"
| 2022-12-25|| Win ||align=left| Yusaku Ishizuki || RISE WORLD SERIES / SHOOTBOXING-KINGS|| Tokyo, Japan || Decision (Unanimous) ||3  ||3:00
|-  style="background:#fbb;"
| 2022-09-17|| Loss ||align=left| Hyuma Hitachi || SHOOT BOXING 2022 act.4|| Tokyo, Japan || KO (Right hook) || 2 || 1:12
|-  style="text-align:center; background:#cfc"
| 2022-06-19 || Win ||align=left| Chihiro Nakajima || THE MATCH 2022 || Tokyo, Japan || Decision (Unanimous) || 3 || 3:00

|-  style="text-align:center; background:#cfc"
| 2022-03-20 || Win || align=left| Motoki || Rizin 34 – Osaka || Osaka, Japan || KO (Flying knee)|| 1 || 2:24

|-  style="text-align:center; background:#cfc;"
| 2021-12-26|| Win ||align=left| Shota Tezuka || Shoot Boxing 2021 Champion Carnival|| Tokyo, Japan || Decision (Unanimous)||  5||3:00
|-
! style=background:white colspan=9 |

|-  style="text-align:center; background:#cfc;"
| 2021-09-04|| Win ||align=left| Pon SirilakGym || Shoot Boxing 2021 act.4 || Tokyo, Japan || TKO (3 knockdowns)  || 2 ||2:20

|-  style="text-align:center; background:#cfc;"
| 2021-04-10|| Win ||align=left| Shuto Miyazaki || Shoot Boxing 2021 act.2 || Tokyo, Japan || Decision (Unanimous)  || 3 || 3:00

|- align="center"  bgcolor="#cfc"
| 2021-02-07|| Win ||align=left| Shogo Kuriaki ||Shoot Boxing 2021 act.2|| Tokyo, Japan || Decision (Unanimous) || 3 || 3:00

|-  style="text-align:center; background:#cfc;"
| 2020-09-19|| Win ||align=left| Shota Tezuka|| Shoot Boxing 2020 act.2 || Tokyo, Japan || TKO (Punches) || 4 || 1:07
|-
! style=background:white colspan=9 |

|-  style="text-align:center; background:#fbb;"
| 2020-07-12|| Loss ||align=left| Tenshin Nasukawa || Rise on Abema || Tokyo, Japan || TKO (3 Knockdowns) || 1 || 1:30

|- align="center"  bgcolor="#cfc"
| 2020-02-15|| Win ||align=left| Kaito Sakaguchi ||Shoot Boxing 2020 act.1|| Tokyo, Japan || 2nd Ext.R Decision (Majority) || 5|| 3:00

|- align="center"  bgcolor="#CCFFCC"
| 2019-12-03|| Win ||align=left| Lertchai Aor.Saensuk ||Shoot Boxing GROUND ZERO TOKYO 2019|| Tokyo, Japan || TKO (Ref. stoppage/Punches) ||3 ||2:23

|- style="text-align:center; background:#CCFFCC;"
| 2019-09-28|| Win || align="left" | Ponchan Bravegym || Shoot Boxing 2019 act.4 ||Tokyo, Japan|| Decision (Unanimous) || 3 || 3:00

|- style="text-align:center; background:#CCFFCC;"
| 2019-06-23|| Win || align="left" | Eisaku Ogasawara || Shoot Boxing 2019 act.3 ||Tokyo, Japan|| TKO (Doctor Stoppage) || 3 || 0:46

|-  style="text-align:center; background:#cfc;"
| 2019-04-27|| Win ||align=left| Shota Tezuka|| Shoot Boxing 2019 act.2 || Tokyo, Japan || KO (Right hook) || 1 || 1:19

|-  style="text-align:center; background:#FFBBBB;"
| 2018-11-18 || Loss ||align=left| Seiki Ueyama|| Shoot Boxing S-cup 65 kg World Tournament 2018, Tournament Final || Tokyo, Japan || TKO (Ref. stop./Punches) || 3 || 0:56
|-
! style=background:white colspan=9 |

|-  style="text-align:center; background:#CCFFCC;"
| 2018-09-15 || Win ||align=left| Kyo Kawakami || Shoot Boxing 2018 act.4, Tournament Semifinal || Tokyo, Japan ||KO (Left cross) || 1 || 3:00

|-  style="text-align:center; background:#CCFFCC;"
| 2018-06-10 || Win ||align=left| Ryota Naito|| Shoot Boxing 2018 act.3, Tournament Quarterfinal || Tokyo, Japan || Decision (Unanimous)|| 3 || 3:00

|-  style="text-align:center; background:#CCFFCC;"
| 2018-04-01 || Win ||align=left| Genki Takeno||Shoot Boxing 2018 act.2 || Tokyo, Japan || Decision (Majority)|| 3 || 3:00

|-  style="text-align:center; background:#CCFFCC;"
| 2018-02-10 || Win ||align=left| Keito Naito|| Shoot Boxing 2018 act.1 || Tokyo, Japan || KO (Right Hook)|| 1 || 2:48

|-  style="text-align:center; background:#CCFFCC;"
| 2017-12-17 || Win ||align=left| Ryu|| Shoot Boxing 2017 Young Cesar in Hanayashiki act.5 || Tokyo, Japan || Decision (Unanimous)|| 3 || 3:00

|-  style="text-align:center; background:#CCFFCC;"
| 2017-10-14 || Win ||align=left| Koki Yamada|| Shoot Boxing 2017 Young Cesar in Hanayashiki act.4 || Tokyo, Japan || Decision (Unanimous)|| 3 || 3:00

|-  style="text-align:center; background:#CCFFCC;"
| 2017-09-16 || Win ||align=left| Shuto Sato|| Shoot Boxing 2017 act.4 || Tokyo, Japan || Decision (Unanimous)|| 3 || 3:00

|-  style="text-align:center; background:#CCFFCC;"
| 2017-08-06 || Win ||align=left| Kim So Hu|| Shoot Boxing 2017 Young Cesar in Hanayashiki act.3 || Tokyo, Japan || TKO (Corner stoppage) || 1 ||

|-  style="text-align:center; background:#CCFFCC;"
| 2017-05-13 || Win ||align=left| Genki Takeno|| Shoot Boxing 2017 Young Cesar in Hanayashiki act.2 || Tokyo, Japan || Decision (Unanimous)|| 3 || 3:00

|-  style="text-align:center; background:#CCFFCC;"
| 2017-04-08 || Win ||align=left| Pako Lai|| Shoot Boxing 2017 act.2 || Tokyo, Japan || TKO (Arm injury) || 1 || 1:30
|-
| colspan=9 | Legend:    

|- align="center"  bgcolor="#CCFFCC"
| 2016-10-09|| Win ||align=left| Taichi Tsuzuki ||Young Caesar in Hanayashiki act.4 || Tokyo, Japan || Decision (Unanimous) ||3 ||2:00

|- align="center"  bgcolor="#CCFFCC"
| 2016-08-21|| Win ||align=left| Taichi Isogai ||Young Caesar in Hanayashiki act.3 || Tokyo, Japan || Decision (Unanimous) ||3 ||2:00

|- align="center"  bgcolor="#CCFFCC"
| 2016-06-18|| Win ||align=left| Kazuya Ueda ||Young Caesar in Hanayashiki act.2, U-16 Tournament Final || Tokyo, Japan || Decision (Unanimous) ||3 ||2:00

|- align="center"  bgcolor="#CCFFCC"
| 2016-06-18|| Win ||align=left| Ryuuto Nakamura ||Young Caesar in Hanayashiki act.2, U-16 Tournament Semi Final || Tokyo, Japan || Decision (Majority) ||3 ||2:00

|- align="center"  bgcolor="#CCFFCC"
| 2016-04-16|| Win ||align=left| Kyosuke Yamaguchi ||Young Caesar in Hanayashiki act.1 || Tokyo, Japan || Decision (Majority) ||3 ||2:00

|- align="center"  bgcolor="#cfc"
| 2016-01-24|| Win||align=left| Kaito Sakaguchi ||All Japan Shoot Boxing Amateur || Tokyo, Japan || Decision (Unanimous) || 2 || 2:00
|-
! style=background:white colspan=9 |

|- align="center"  bgcolor="#CCFFCC"
| 2015-09-27|| Win ||align=left| Kazuya Ueda ||9th All Japan Amateur Shootboxing Championship || Tokyo, Japan ||  || ||
|-
! style=background:white colspan=9 |

|- align="center"  bgcolor="#CCFFCC"
| 2015-06-22|| Win ||align=left| Kyosuke Yamaguchi ||Muay Thai Open Amateur 31 || Tokyo, Japan ||  || ||
|-
! style=background:white colspan=9 |

|- align="center"  bgcolor="#CCFFCC"
| 2014-12-21|| Win ||align=left| Ryoga Matsumoto ||All Japan Amateur Shoot Boxing || Japan || TKO || 1|| 
|-
! style=background:white colspan=9 |

|- align="center"  bgcolor="#CCFFCC"
| 2014-06-29|| Win ||align=left| Hotaru Shigematsu ||Amateur Shootboxing Kansai || Osaka, Japan || TKO || 1||

|- align="center"  bgcolor="#FFBBBB"
| 2014-06-29|| Loss ||align=left| Kyo Kawakami ||Amateur Shootboxing Kansai || Osaka, Japan || Ext.R Decision (Unanimous) || 2|| 2:00

|- align="center"  bgcolor="#CCFFCC"
| 2013-11-16|| Win ||align=left| Toma Maezono ||Shootboxing GROUND ZERO TOKYO 2013, All Japan Amateur Shootboxing Final || Tokyo, Japan || Decision (Unanimous) || 1|| 2:00 
|-
! style=background:white colspan=9 |

|-  style="text-align:center; background:#CCFFCC;"
| 2013-02-10|| Win||align=left| Kisho Inoue || SHOOT BOXING Amateur || Tokyo, Japan || KO ||1 ||

|-  style="text-align:center; background:#c5d2ea;"
| 2010-08-07 || Draw ||align=left| Toshiya Fumi || Young Caesar Cup Tokyo 2010 || Tokyo, Japan || Decision (Unanimous)|| 1 || 2:00

|-
| colspan=9 | Legend:

See also
 List of male kickboxers

References

2001 births
Living people
Taito people
People from Taitō
Sportspeople from Tokyo
Japanese male kickboxers